Desa is a Turkish leather goods producer and retailer.

History
The company was founded in Istanbul by chemistry student Melih Çelet in the early 70s to produce leather goods for export and the local market through Desa's own retail outlets. The New York office was opened in 1986 and today Desa exports leather clothing and accessories to the US and Europe. Today Desa has factories in Istanbul and Düzce, their own tannery in Çorlu, 70 retail stores in Turkey. As well as their own brands Desa also produces goods for international brands.
The company has also been a Turkish distributor of the Samsonite brand since the 1980s.
A 30% share of Desa was floated on the Istanbul Stock Exchange in 2004.

References

External links
DESA | Deri Mont, Deri Ceket, Çanta ve Ayakkabı Modelleri

Companies of Turkey
Clothing brands of Turkey
Retail companies of Turkey
Retail companies established in 1972
Turkish companies established in 1972